Hallstein is a given name and surname.

Given name 
Hallstein Bøgseth (born 1954), Norwegian Nordic combined skier
Hallstein Høgåsen (born 1937), Norwegian physicist
Hallstein Rasmussen (1925–2016), Norwegian civil servant

Surname 
Ingeborg Hallstein (born 1936), German coloratura soprano
Walter Hallstein (1901–1982), German academic, diplomat and statesman

See also 
Hallstein Commission, is the European Commission that held office from 7 January 1958 to 30 June 1967
Hallstein Doctrine, was a key principle in the foreign policy of the Federal Republic of Germany (West Germany)
Walter Hallstein Prize, German and European award